Ginbata Airport  is an airport serving the Roy Hill Minesite in the Pilbara region of Western Australia.

Charter services to the airport commenced on the 13 August 2013.

Airlines and destinations

See also
 List of airports in Western Australia
 Aviation transport in Australia

References

External links

 Airservices Aerodromes & Procedure Charts

Pilbara airports
Iron ore mining in Western Australia